Thomas William Lawless (March 3, 1908 – June 19, 1966), better known as Bucky Lawless, was an American welterweight boxer from Auburn, New York, who fought 131 professional bouts between April 30, 1925, and October 9, 1936. He was known for his hair-trigger left-handed punch. Lawless was one of the first boxers to be approved by the New York State Athletic Commission to box in professional bouts before he was 18 years of age. During Lawless' boxing career, sports writers called him the "Uncrowned Welterweight Champion of the World" by virtue of his non-title victories over four champions.

Early life 
Thomas "Bucky" Lawless was born on March 3, 1908, in Auburn, New York. His parents were Martin J. Lawless (1869–1941) and Francis T. Lawless (née O'Brien; 1883–1946). His father was born in Ireland, emigrated to the U.S. in 1882, and worked for the New York Central Railroad, while his mother was born in Ontario, Canada, and emigrated to the U.S. in 1889. Thomas was nicknamed "Bucky" by his friends soon after he began grade school at Holy Family School in Auburn. One of his first jobs was as a newspaper hawker for the Auburn Citizen, which is when he learned to fight in alley brawls with other newsies. Lawless dropped out of junior high school to learn boxing. On September 18, 1924, at 16 years of age, he made his lightweight debut in Moravia, New York, where he fought Red Curry from Binghamton, NY.  After three rounds, Lawless was awarded the decision.

Boxing career 
Lawless' professional boxing debut occurred on September 28, 1925, when he fought and won against Tony Occipenti at Town Hall, Scranton, PA, by points after six rounds. He won 14 consecutive matches between September 1925 and May 1926, which included winning the Champion Lightweight of Central New York title from Sailor Pacilio (Ralph Rocco Pacilio) on April 12, 1926, at the Syracuse Arena in Syracuse, NY. His first professional loss occurred on May 28, 1926, in the Syracuse Arena, when he lost his match by points against Jackie Brady (Amedio Pizzica) and gave up his title to him. The crowd of over 5,000 did not approve of the judges' decision and jeered. The Auburn Citizen, reporting on the fight, declared that favoritism was shown to Brady by the judges and that Lawless had been robbed of his title. Lawless lost by points in a rematch against Brady on July 16, 1926, at Star Park in Syracuse. The rematch nearly did not occur for several reasons: initially, it was rumored that Lawless and boxer Canastota Bob (Joseph Kanafolo) had been "given a vacation" (suspended) by the New York State Boxing Commission after Lawless and Bob had recently worked in the corners of amateur boxers at a match in Ithaca, NY. Deputy State Commissioner Hodges responded that he would not interfere and that Lawless would be able to fight Brady.  After two postponements, Lawless' manager, Edward Epstein, stated that Lawless would be unable to meet the stipulated weight and that taking off too much weight quickly would weaken him, leaving him in no shape to fight. During a scheduled conference, Charlie Celli, Brady's manager, stated that if Lawless did not meet the weight standard, he would consider it a forfeit. Epstein retorted that if another agreement was not reached, he would not permit Lawless to fight. A second conference that Lawless and Brady attended was scheduled the next day. The argument between Epstein and Celli during this conference became so heated that Marc Buckland, president of the Syracuse Arena Athletic Club, had to intervene several times to prevent the two managers from physically fighting each other. After over three hours of negotiations, an agreement was reached and the match was scheduled. Joe Netro of the Syracuse Arena Athletic Club, while speaking with reporters quipped that he was thinking of calling off the upcoming match at Star Park because he had heard there would be a "Lawless element there".

Lawless won the Welterweight Title of Central New York on October 14, 1927, when he defeated Billy Leonard at the Syracuse Arena in six rounds.  Bucky carried all the rounds except for the second and fourth. It was called a grudge match after Leonard and his manager were "nasty" to Lawless while in the dressing rooms before the match, calling him a "small town pug" and a "country boy". In the sixth round, Leonard stood in the center of the ring, challenging Lawless to "come on",  who accepted and effectively won the sixth round and the bout. Collyer's Eye, a weekly sports journal published in Chicago from 1915 to 1929, ran regularly scheduled articles that rated  professional welterweight boxers. Although the rating methodology was not described, the article stated that all factors were taken into consideration in the figures employed and the system gives an accurate slant on a fighter's chances in a bout against another rated boxer. The purpose of the article was to allow readers to view two rated boxers for an upcoming bout and to select the projected winner based on his higher rating. These ratings were officially endorsed by the National Boxing Association and Pennsylvania Commission. Lawless first appeared in the rankings in the 15 October 1927 edition of Collyer's Eye. He was among 122 boxers listed in this edition and they were rated with scores between 109 and 300.  Lawless was rated at 239. Of the eight fighters Lawless fought in 1927 who were rated in the same article, Lawless had victories over three fighters who had lower ratings than him (Bobby Richardson, Willie Greb, Eddie Dyer), and a loss against one fighter with a lower rating than him (Eddie Burnbrook). He had victories over two of the fighters who had higher ratings than him (Billy Leonard, Willie Harmon) and a draw with one fighter with a higher rating (Pete August). Lawless lost only one bout in 1927 against a fighter with a higher rating than him (Jack Zivic).  In the 03 August 1929 edition of Collyer's Eye and The Baseball World, Bucky Lawless was ranked as Number 8 among "The Ten Best" welterweight fighters in a pool of 184 rated welterweight boxers.  In the 19 July 1930 edition of Collyer's Eye and The Baseball World, Lawless was ranked Number 6 among the "Ten Best Welterweights." Lawless continued to rate among the Ten Best Welterweights into 1931.

Lawless fought seven World Welterweight Boxing Champions during his career, but never held the title himself. Sportswriters during this period editorialized about "overweight farces". Robert Edgren, the nationally syndicated American sports reporter, wrote in 1931 that welterweight champions "have been dodging the tough ones by making good contenders come in overweight. And they fought Bucky Lawless without any great success...That old gag again. Making Lawless come in overweight so that [Lou] Brouillard couldn't lose his title" as a response to the ten-round welterweight contest between Lawless and Lou Brouillard at Boston Garden on December 2, 1931, the latter of whom was the world welterweight boxing champion.  Although Brouillard won the match by KO in the third round, both fighters came in over the weight limit, so his title was never at risk. Fighting Lawless in a title bout would have been risky for Brouillard because Lawless had appeared in four previous overweight matches and defeated them all. He won decisions over Joe Dundee, Tommy Freeman, and two over Young Jack Thompson (Cecil Lewis Thompson).  One of the earlier non-title matches against Thompson was held seven months earlier on May 8, 1931, at Chicago Stadium. Lawless won this match, and although Thompson was the World Welterweight Champion at the time, Lawless was forced to come into the match overweight so that Thompson's title was not at risk. Lawless fought American Middleweight Champion Gorilla Jones (William Landon Jones) six times between 1928 and 1931, defeating him in four of these matches.  During his professional boxing career, Lawless fought at venues across the country including Madison Square Garden in Manhattan, Brooklyn, NY; Atlantic City, NJ; Seattle, WA; New Orleans, LA; Cleveland, OH; Detroit, MI; Los Angeles, CA; Chicago, IL; Boston, MA; Pittsburgh, PA; Rochester, NY; and Buffalo, NY. The largest percentage (27%) of his 131 professional matches were fought in Syracuse, NY. By 1927 Lawless was the greatest drawing card for boxing matches in Syracuse.

Personal life 
Lawless moved from Auburn, NY, to Syracuse, NY in early 1930. By then he trained in Syracuse, NY, where he was managed by Joe Netro.  Lawless married Norma Lila Conlin of Potsdam, NY on March 20, 1930, in Syracuse. The Syracuse Journal wrote an article about the newlywed couple's home life in their apartment at The James, and featured four large at-home photographs with captions, such as Lawless serving coffee, washing dishes, and listening to the new radio with his wife. Lawless moved back to Auburn in 1933.

Lawless was honored by his home city of Auburn, NY on May 13, 1931. A week after his May 8 victory over Thompson, he arrived in Auburn shortly after 8:00 p.m. and was met at the Five Points by more than a hundred cars. Lawless sat in an elevated position on his roadster and a parade of three cars abreast escorted him through Fulton Street, Genesee Street, State Street, and Dill Street where the parade ended at the Auburn Fraternal Order of the Eagles. A reception was held in the Eagles Lodge where it was reported that hundreds of fans were turned away because of the limited space. Speakers at the reception included Joseph Hanlon, chairman of the event; John Donavan, City Manager; Syracuse journalists John McGrath and Martin La Chance; and Lawless himself.

After Lawless stopped boxing professionally in 1936, he lived in his hometown of Auburn, NY, where he worked as a laborer for public works and for business owner Thomas J. Hennessy.  Lawless stayed active in Auburn local events; for example, he acted as master of ceremonies during a bowling match held in Auburn at the Roman Alleys on March 10, 1940, in which ex-fighters competed against ex-ball players. Lawless died after a long illness at age 58 on June 19, 1966.

Professional boxing record
All information in this section is derived from BoxRec, unless otherwise stated.

Official record

All newspaper decisions are officially regarded as “no decision” bouts and are not counted in the win/loss/draw column.

Unofficial record

Record with the inclusion of newspaper decisions in the win/loss/draw column.

References

External links 
Newspaper Articles on Bucky Lawless from FultonHistory.com
 

1908 births
1966 deaths
Boxers from New York (state)
American male boxers